Vale of Clyde Football Club are a Scottish football club based in the East End of Glasgow. Nicknamed Tin Pail, the club officially date their founding in 1873, although contemporary press reports don't actually date the club until 1885, and is based at Fullarton Park in the Fullarton neighbourhood (near to Tollcross and Auchenshuggle). The team colours are blue, red and white.

Possibly the oldest Junior club still in existence and certainly among the oldest handful, the club were one of the most successful sides in the game's early era and won the Scottish Junior Cup on three occasions as well as several prominent regional competitions, although since World War II they have won little and existed as a minor presence.

In 2020, it was confirmed that Vale of Clyde (along with the 62 other West Region Junior clubs) had successfully applied to join the new West of Scotland Football League in the senior pyramid.

Honours

Scottish Junior Cup
Winners: 1890–91, 1892–93, 1903–04
Runners-up: 1941–42

Other honours
Glasgow Junior Football League winners: 1899–1900, 1912–13, 1917–18, 1919–20
Glasgow Junior Cup: 1891–92, 1892–93, 1897–98, 1917–18
Glasgow Dryburgh Cup: 1933–34
Central League Cup: 1988–89
Evening Times Cup Winners Cup: 1989–90
Central League Division One winners 2004–05

References

External links
 Twitter
 Facebook

Football clubs in Scotland
Scottish Junior Football Association clubs
Association football clubs established in 1873
Football clubs in Glasgow
1873 establishments in Scotland
West of Scotland Football League teams